Barry Donald (born 24 December 1978) is a Scottish footballer who played for Stenhousemuir, Queen of the South, Dumbarton, Forfar Athletic, Albion Rovers, Linlithgow Rose and Stranraer.

References

1978 births
Scottish footballers
Dumbarton F.C. players
Stenhousemuir F.C. players
Queen of the South F.C. players
Forfar Athletic F.C. players
Albion Rovers F.C. players
Stranraer F.C. players
Linlithgow Rose F.C. players
Scottish Football League players
Living people
Association football midfielders